Stewart Michael Glenister (born October 12, 1988) is a class of 2011 West Point cadet who competed in the 2008 Olympic Games in the 50 m freestyle swimming event, where he won his first heat event. Glenister's parents are both from American Samoa, so he represented that nation at the Olympics in Beijing.

References

External links
 

Swimmers at the 2008 Summer Olympics
United States Military Academy alumni
1988 births
Living people
Swimmers from Kentucky
American male swimmers
American Samoan male swimmers
American people of Samoan descent
Olympic swimmers of American Samoa